Herbert Simpson (29 September 1863 – 29 December 1929) was an English footballer who made three appearances in the Football League playing for Lincoln City as a left back. Simpson played in Lincoln City's first FA Cup match, in 1884, was part of the team that won the inaugural Midland League title in 1889–90, and represented the club in their first season in the Football League, in 1892–93.

References

1863 births
1929 deaths
People from Sleaford, Lincolnshire
English footballers
Association football fullbacks
Lincoln City F.C. players
English Football League players